HMHS Liberty was a hospital ship which served with the Royal Navy during the First World War. Formerly the steam yacht Liberty, she was built in 1908 for Joseph Pulitzer, then renamed to Glencairn when sold to James Clark Ross in 1912 before reverting to the Liberty in 1914 when sold to Lord Tredegar. The ship served as a hospital ship in World War I, before being broken up in 1937.

See also
 List of hospitals and hospital ships of the Royal Navy

References

1908 ships
Hospital ships in World War I
Ships of the Royal Navy